Tamigalesus is a genus of spiders in the family Salticidae. It is found in India and Sri Lanka.

Species 
It contains two species:

 Tamigalesus munnaricus (Żabka, 1988) India, Sri Lanka
 Tamigalesus fabus (Kanesharatnam & Benjamin, 2020) Sri Lanka

References

Salticidae genera
Salticidae